Irène-Fournier Ecological Reserve is an ecological reserve in Quebec, Canada. It was established on November 20, 1991.

References

External links
 Official website from Government of Québec

Protected areas of Bas-Saint-Laurent
Nature reserves in Quebec
Protected areas established in 1991
1991 establishments in Quebec